SDSS J1430+2303 (or SDSS J143016.05+230344.4) is a galaxy with an active galactic nucleus that has been claimed to be undergoing a periodic brightness variability that is speeding up. One explanation for the purported behavior is that it could be a supermassive black hole binary. Initial trajectory models suggested the pair could be merging either before the end of 2022 or, alternatively, within three years. 

Additional observational data published in September 2022 predict the merger to happen within the next three years.

Galaxy
SDSS J1430+2303 is a Seyfert 1 galaxy, an elliptical galaxy with a mass of 150 billion solar masses.

SDSS J1430+2303 is 1.05 × 1022 km from Earth (or 1.11 billion light years, 339 Mpc) with a redshift of 0.08105.

It has an Hα line emission, blue-shifted by 2400 km/s, relative to other emission lines from the galaxy.

An estimate of a supermassive black hole at its center is 40 million solar masses.

References

Seyfert galaxies
Boötes